First Letter First is a British game show that aired on BBC1 from 5 January to 23 March 1993. It is hosted by Don Maclean.

External links
 

1990s British game shows
1993 British television series debuts
1993 British television series endings
BBC television game shows
English-language television shows